Frankie Gan Joon Zin (born 16 July 1966) is a Malaysian politician and a member of the Malaysian Chinese Association (MCA), a major component party in the Barisan Nasional (BN) coalition. He is also a community leader in Bukit Bintang, Kuala Lumpur.

NGO activity
Gan was the national treasurer for St. John Ambulance Malaysia (2001 to 2005). He is also the Secretary for the Pertubuhan Kesenian dan Warisan Masyarakat Malaysia Kuala Lumpur.

The singing candidate
Gan is known for his love of singing, and was in the entertainment business when he was younger. In 2013, his video "Love Is In The Air" was widely viewed in Malaysia, and the respective political advertisement appeared on the Australian TV show Gruen Nation. The publicity from the video boosted Gan's political career, and he gained support from many Malaysian Chinese voters. In an act to woo voters, Gan began singing during his campaigns, and made an MTV Karaoke CD to be distributed to the public, including Tamil songs, Hakka songs and others. The public response was mixed.

Election results

Honours
Gan was awarded the Bintang Kesatria Mahkota Wilayah from  Yang di-Pertuan Agong (King of Malaysia) in recognition of his community service.

 :
 Officer of the Order of the Territorial Crown (K.M.W.) (2009)

References

1966 births
Living people
People from Malacca
Malaysian people of Chinese descent
Malaysian Chinese Association politicians
21st-century Malaysian politicians